The Green River is a tributary of the Deerfield River in southern Vermont and northwestern Massachusetts in the United States.

The Green River had an influential role in the settlement and economic growth of the towns in its watershed. Greenfield, Massachusetts, where the river ends, got its name from the Green River. The largest water user of the Green River is the Greenfield Water Department which draws 2.12 million gallons of water per day through a combination of surface and groundwater sources.

Geography 
The Green River begins in Marlboro, Vermont, then goes east through Halifax, then Guilford, where it turns south into Massachusetts. It continues south and acts as the border for Colrain and Leyden. In total it runs 31.5 miles (50.7 km), 14.8 in Vermont and 16.7 in Massachusetts. It runs into the Deerfield River which then runs just under two miles into the Connecticut River.

Land use in the Massachusetts portion of the river (52.6 square miles) consists of 65% forest, 13% Agricultural, and 11% residential. The majority of the residential area is in Greenfield. The total drainage of the Green River sub-watershed is 89.8 square miles. Interstate 91 is the only highway to cross over it.

The Green River is part of the Deerfield River watershed, which is in the Connecticut River watershed.

Tributaries 
In Massachusetts
 Greenfield: Wheeler Brook, Cherry Rum Brook, Arms Brook, Mill Brook, Allen Brook, Punch Brook, Hinsdale Brook, Glen Brook
 Colrain: Workman Brook, Johnson Brook, Stafford Brook, Borden Brook
 Leyden: Katley Brook, Hibbard Brook, Harris Brook, Thorne Brook

In Vermont
 Guilford: Roaring Brook, Hinesburg
 Halifax: Pond Brook, Harrisville Brook

Ecology 
The river's banks range from colder, forested mixed coniferous forests to broader floodplains as it widens near its mouth. Typical tree species include cottonwood, American linden (basswood), sycamore, willows, red and white oak, silver maple and more. Herbaceous species include Japanese knotweed, cocklebur, Jerusalem artichoke, ferns, and many spring ephemeral species including wild ginger, toothwort, trout lily and others.

Overall Green River has been classified as a Class A public water supply and coldwater fishery.

Northern Redbelly Dace were first discovered in the Green River sub-watershed in 1940. They represent the only known population of the species in Massachusetts. Also on a few occasions Atlantic Salmon and American Eels have been found in the sub-watershed while spawning.

Environmental issues 
The river has a number of environmental issues. Most of the pollution comes from the last 3.7 miles of the river located primarily in Greenfield, Massachusetts. This has been due to fecal coliform, lack of riparian zones, and one dam in disrepair. The fecal problem can be linked to two sources: manured farmland, and sewage leakage in commercial Greenfield.

Recreation 
The biggest recreation attraction on the Green River is the Green River Swimming & Recreation Area. The recreation area was given to the town in two parts by a private owner, one part in 1929 and the other part in 1933. The area is 22 acres and is located on Nash's Mill Road in Greenfield, Massachusetts, west of downtown. This part of the river has a dam that is raised during the day in the summer months to make the river into a temporary pool.

See also 
 List of rivers of Vermont

Rivers of Massachusetts
Rivers of Vermont
Tributaries of the Connecticut River
Rivers of Windham County, Vermont
Rivers of Franklin County, Massachusetts